= Lleida Old Town =

District of Lleida, Catalonia, Spain

Coordinates: 41°36′46″N 0°37′23″E

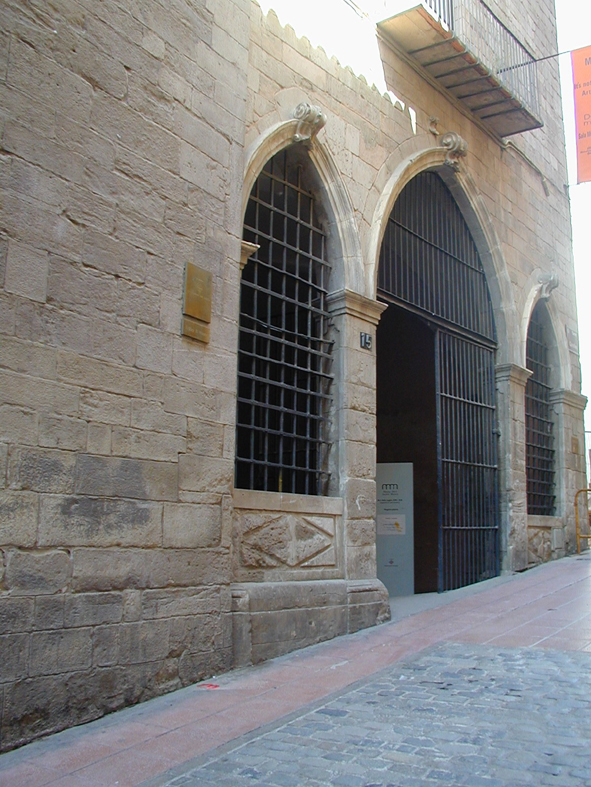

Lleida Old Town (Catalan: Centre històric de Lleida, Spanish: Centro histórico de Lérida) is a district of Lleida, Catalonia, Spain. As of 2008 it had a population of 10,659 people.
